Alberto Zalamea Costa (24 August 1929 — 2 September 2011) was a Colombian journalist, politician, and diplomat. He served as the ambassador of Colombia to Côte d'Ivoire, Venezuela and Italy.

Zalamea began his early career as a journalist. His first job in journalism was with the La Razon newspaper. By 1959, Zalamea had been promoted to the editor of La Semana. A strong proponent of freedom of the press, Zalamea operated a magazine called La Nueva Prensa. He also became a columnist for El Tiempo and Revista Cromos. Zalamea was elected to the Chamber of Representatives of Colombia in 1970. He later became a diplomat, serving as Colombia's ambassador to  Côte d'Ivoire, Venezuela and Italy.

Death
Zalamea underwent hip surgery in 2011, which preceded a decline in his health. He died on September 2, 2011, aged 82, and was survived by his wife, Cecilia Fajardo.

References

1929 births
2011 deaths
People from Barcelona
Spanish people of Colombian descent
Spanish emigrants to Colombia
Naturalized citizens of Colombia
Colombian people of Catalan descent
Colombian male writers
Colombian journalists
Male journalists
Colombian magazine editors
Members of the Chamber of Representatives of Colombia
Ambassadors of Colombia to Ivory Coast
Ambassadors of Colombia to Venezuela
Ambassadors of Colombia to Italy

es:Alberto_Zalamea